USS Comstock (LSD-45) is a  of the United States Navy. She was the second Navy ship to be named for the Comstock Lode in Nevada, the first being , commissioned in 1945 and decommissioned in 1976. The Comstock Lode was discovered in 1859, and was one of the richest deposits of precious metals known in the world.

Comstock was laid down on 27 October 1986, by the Avondale Shipyards, New Orleans, Louisiana; launched on 15 January 1988; and commissioned on 3 February 1990. At first USS Comstock had an all-male crew, but soon became the first United States Navy combatant ship to have a fully integrated crew of male and female sailors.

As of 2002, Comstock is homeported at NS San Diego, California, and assigned to Expeditionary Strike Group 3. As of 2014, she is part of the Makin Island amphibious ready group.

In December 2020 the U.S. Navy's Report to Congress on the Annual Long-Range Plan for Construction of Naval Vessels stated that the ship was planned to be placed Out of Commission in Reserve in 2026.

References

External links 

 

 

 

Whidbey Island-class dock landing ships
Cold War amphibious warfare vessels of the United States
Amphibious warfare vessels of the United States
Ships built in Bridge City, Louisiana
1988 ships